Severivka - is a former village in Ukraine. It is located in the Korosten Raion of the Zhytomyr Oblast and was subordinated to the Lyubar village council. Due to radioactive contamination as a result of the Chernobyl disaster in 1986, all the residents were evicted. In 1981, 80 people lived in Severovka. On 27 June 1996, Severivka was deregistered by the Zhytomyr Oblast Council. Almost all the buildings in the village are collapsed now, there are no residents. The average radiation background in the Severivka is about 50-60 usv/hr. On 2 May 2018, a memorial plaque "Severivka is our native village" was installed by former villagers.

Severivka was previously located in Narodychi Raion until was abolished on 18 July 2020 as part of the administrative reform of Ukraine, which reduced the number of raions of Zhytomyr Oblast to four. The area of Narodychi Raion was merged into Korosten Raion.

See also
Chernobyl Exclusion Zone

References

External links

Ghost towns in the Chernobyl Exclusion Zone

Villages in Korosten Raion
Populated places disestablished in 1986
1986 disestablishments in Ukraine